Acrobolbaceae is liverwort family in the order Jungermanniales.

Subfamilies and genera
Subfamilies and genera of Acrobolbaceae:
Enigmella G.A.M.Scott & K.G.Beckm. (not assigned to a subfamily)
Acrobolboideae R.M.Schust. ex Briscoe
Acrobolbus Nees
Austrolophozioideae R.M.Schust. ex Crand.-Stol.
Austrolophozia R.M.Schust.
Goebelobryum Grolle
Lethocoleoideae Grolle
Lethocolea Mitt.
Saccogynidioideae Crand.-Stotl.
Saccogynidium Grolle

References

External links

Jungermanniales
Liverwort families